Mountain Mission is an unincorporated community on Charles Town Road (West Virginia Route 115) in Jefferson County, West Virginia, United States. Mountain Mission lies between the Shenandoah River and the community of Mannings.

References

Unincorporated communities in Jefferson County, West Virginia
Unincorporated communities in West Virginia